Hereditary fibrosing poikiloderma with tendon contractures, myopathy and pulmonary fibrosis is a rare genetic syndrome characterised by poikiloderma, tendon contractures and progressive pulmonary fibrosis. It is also known as POIKTMP syndrome.

Presentation

The main characteristics of this condition are poikiloderma, tendon contractures and progressive pulmonary fibrosis.

Other features include

Skin
 Facial telangiectasia
 Mottled hypo- and hyperpigmentation
 Papules
 Epidermal atrophy
 Scanty hair 

Tendon contractures affecting the
 Digits
 Ankles

Other
 Exocrine pancreatic insufficiency
 Liver impairment
 Growth retardation

Magnetic resonance imaging shows muscle atrophy and fatty infiltration of the muscles. Muscle biopsy shows fibrosis and fatty infiltration. Skin biopsy shows fibrosis and alterations of the elastic network.

Genetics

This condition is caused by mutations in the (FAM111B) gene. This gene is located on the long arm of chromosome 11 (11q12.1).

The inheritance of this condition is autosomal dominant.

Diagnosis

This diagnosis is made by sequencing the FAM111B gene.

Differential diagnosis
 Poikiloderma of Weary

Management

There is presently no curative treatment. Management is supportive.

Epidemiology

The prevalence is not known but this is considered to be a rare disease. About fifty cases have bene described in the literature up to 2019.

History

This condition was first described in 2006.

References

Genetic diseases and disorders
Rare syndromes